Meerwein is a surname.

People with the surname Meerwein include:

 Carl Friedrich Meerwein, German engineer
 Hans Meerwein, German chemist

Meerwein may also refer to several chemical terms named after Hans Meerwein:

 Meerwein arylation
 Meerwein–Ponndorf–Verley reduction
 Meerwein's salt
 Wagner–Meerwein rearrangement